Lukas Schmitz (born 13 October 1988) is a German professional footballer who plays as a left back.

Career
Schmitz began his career with TSG Sprockhövel. Here he scored 11 goals in 23 games during the 2006–07 season of the Verbandsliga Westfalen 2. In July 2007, he signed for VfL Bochum II. He played 36 games with the VfL Bochum reserve squad.

Schmitz transferred to nearby rivals Schalke 04 on 8 May 2009. He made his professional debut on 18 September 2009 in a match against VfL Wolfsburg. Schmitz used to play as a left midfielder or a defensive midfielder. In the 2010–11 season, he became the Schalke's main left fullback.

Schmitz signed a four-year contract with Werder Bremen on 17 June 2011. In 2014, he joined Fortuna Düsseldorf.

Later on, Schmitz went to Austria to play for Wolfsberger AC in 2018. In May 2020, he signed for VVV-Venlo to play there until June 2022, starting from 2020–21.

Personal life
Schmitz studies Political sciences and Science of Public Administration over distance learning.

Honours
Schalke 04
 DFB-Pokal: 2010–11

References

External links
 
 

1988 births
Living people
German footballers
Association football midfielders
TSG Sprockhövel players
VfL Bochum II players
FC Schalke 04 players
FC Schalke 04 II players
SV Werder Bremen players
Fortuna Düsseldorf players
Wolfsberger AC players
VVV-Venlo players
Bundesliga players
2. Bundesliga players
Regionalliga players
Austrian Football Bundesliga players
Eredivisie players
German expatriate footballers
German expatriate sportspeople in Austria
Expatriate footballers in Austria
German expatriate sportspeople in the Netherlands
Expatriate footballers in the Netherlands
People from Hattingen
Sportspeople from Arnsberg (region)
Footballers from North Rhine-Westphalia